Gundomar I (also Gundimar, Godomar, or Godemar) was eldest son and successor of Gebicca, King of the Burgundians. He succeeded his father in 406 or 407 and reigned until 411. He was succeeded by his brother Giselher.

In the Nibelungenlied, he is named Gernot (sometimes Gernoz) and he is the brother of Gunther, Giselher and Kriemhild.

In Norse mythology, he is called Guthormr, and he was the murderer of Sigurd (Sigfried), the dragon slayer.

See also
Germanic king

Kings of the Burgundians
German heroic legends
4th-century births
411 deaths
Nibelung tradition
5th-century monarchs in Europe